The shilling (abbreviation: KSh; ISO code: KES) is the currency of Kenya. It is divided into 100 cents.

Notation

An equals sign or hyphen represents zero amount. For example, 50 cents is written as "" and 100 shillings as "" or "100/-". Sometimes the abbreviation KSh is prefixed for distinction. If the amount is written using words as well as numerals, only the prefix is used (e.g. KSh 10 million).

This pattern was modelled on sterling's pre-decimal notation, in which amounts were written in some combination of pounds (£), shillings (s), and pence (d, for denarius).  In that notation, amounts under a pound were notated only in shillings and pence.

History
The Kenyan shilling replaced the East African shilling in 1966 at par.

Coins

In 1973 and 1985, 5/= coins were introduced, followed by 10/= in 1994 and 20/= in 1998.

Between 1967 and 1978, the portrait of Jomo Kenyatta, the first president of Kenya, originally appeared on the obverse of all of independent Kenya's coins. In 1980, a portrait of Daniel arap Moi replaced Kenyatta until 2005, when the central bank introduced a new coin series that restored the portrait of Kenyatta. A bi-metallic 40/= coin with the portrait of then-President Mwai Kibaki was issued in 2003 to commemorate the fortieth anniversary of Kenyan independence (1963).

New coins with the image of Kenyatta were issued in 2005. In 2010, Section 231(4) of the 2010 Constitution of Kenya stated "Notes and coins issued by the Central Bank of Kenya may bear images that depict or symbolise Kenya or an aspect of Kenya but may not bear the portrait of any individual." New banknotes and coins were scheduled to be released by 2018 to meet up with this new law. All of the coins depict the national Coat of arms of Kenya on the obverse and images of Africa's recognisable animals on the reverse. The new series of coins is designed to be more recognisable for visually impaired people.

Banknotes 

On 14 September 1966, the Kenyan shilling replaced the East African shilling at par, although the latter was not demonetised until 1969. The Central Bank of Kenya issued notes in denominations of 5/=, 10/=, 20/=, 50/= and 100/=. All of the notes feature a portrait of Kenya's first prime minister and president, Jomo Kenyatta, on the front and diverse economic activities on the back.

5/= notes were replaced by coins in 1985, with the same happening to 10/= and 20/= in 1994 and 1998. In 1986, 200/= notes were introduced, followed by 500/= in 1988 and 1,000/= in 1994.

As with the coins, Kenyatta appeared on the banknotes issued until 1978, with Daniel arap Moi's portrait replacing him in 1980. In 2003, after Mwai Kibaki replaced Moi as president, 5/=, 10/=, and 20/= notes from the 1978 series with Kenyatta's picture that had been in storage were issued, and circulated for a time. A new series of notes was then introduced on which Kenyatta reappeared in denominations of 50/=, 100/=, 200/=, 500/= and 1,000/=. The issue of the 200/= banknote dated 12 December 2003 commemorates the "40 years of Independence 1963–2003". The banknotes are printed in Nairobi by security printer De La Rue.

On 31 May 2019, the Central Bank of Kenya issued a new family of banknotes without the portraits of known Kenyan individuals, as mandated by the Constitution of Kenya of 2010. At the same time, the Central Bank of Kenya has withdrawn all previous versions of the 1,000/= banknote. These remained legal tender until 1 October 2019. All of the banknotes for this series share a common design of the Kenyatta International Convention Centre on the front side of the notes, and the back side of the notes feature images showcasing the richness of the people and nature of Kenya: "Green Energy" (50/=), "Agriculture" (100/=), "Social Services" (200/=), "Tourism" (500/=) and "Governance" (1,000/=). All five denominations also embody each of the big five animals of Africa: the buffalo (50/=), the leopard (100/=), rhinoceros (200/=), the lion (500/=) and the elephant (1,000/=).

Exchange rate
The current exchange rate is readily obtainable from services such as those in the table below:

See also
 Economy of Kenya
 Ugandan shilling
 Tanzanian shilling
 Shilingi (disambiguation)

References

External links
Official website of the Central Bank of Kenya

Circulating currencies
Currencies of Africa
Currencies of the Commonwealth of Nations
Currencies of Kenya
shilling
Currencies introduced in 1966